Osama Hamdan (born 1965) is a senior representative of Hamas in Lebanon and is a member of the organization's politburo. He is a member of the Arab National Congress and of the Arab Islamic Conference of the Board of Trustees of the Jerusalem Institute in Lebanon.

Early life
Hamdan was born in the Bureij refugee camp in the Gaza Strip to a Palestinian refugee family that fled the village of al-Batani al-Sharqi during the 1948 Arab-Israeli War. He attended high school in Kuwait, graduating in 1982. He then enrolled at the Yarmouk University in Irbid, Jordan where he graduated with a Bachelor's Degree in Chemistry in 1986. While he was at university, Hamdan became an activist with the Islamic Student Movement. He returned to Kuwait after graduating and worked in the industrial sector until the Gulf War in 1990.

Hamas representative
After leaving Kuwait, Hamdan worked at the Hamas office in Tehran as assistant to then Hamas representative Imad Alami from 1992 to 1993. He became Hamas' official representative in Iran in 1994, serving in that post until 1998. While undertaking this post, Hamdan said that the "flourishing relations" between Iran and Hamas were at the expense of the once-good relationship between Iran and the Palestinian Liberation Organization (PLO). However, he stated "There is an absence of any proof or evidence of Iranian financial support to Hamas, Islamic Jihad and other Palestinian factions who have established contacts with Iran. It is merely rumours and speculation."

In 1998, Hamdan was appointed as Hamas representative in Lebanon, a post he retains. In 2004, he served as Hamas' spokesman in Cairo during a dialogue between Palestinian factions. He has also participated in talks between Hamas and European officials. Hamdan has advocated Palestinian unity talks and in an interview with Al-Arabiya on May 20, 2009, he said "I understand that each of us [Hamas and Fatah] must set conditions to reach an agreement. National dialogue must be based on national interests of the Palestinian people..."

In an interview which aired on Al-Jadid/New TV on May 4, 2011 (as translated by MEMRI), Hamdan stated that "politically, the two-state solution is over" and that "we are entering the phase of the liberation of Palestine... the notion of Return: the return of the refugees to their homeland, and the return of the Israelis to the countries from which they came."

In an interview which aired on the Lebanese Al-Quds TV channel on July 28, 2014 (as translated by MEMRI), Hamdan stated that "killing children...is engraved in the historical Zionist and Jewish mentality." Commenting on the accusation of Blood Libel against Jews, Hamdan stated "we all remember how the Jews used to slaughter Christians, in order to mix their blood in their holy matzos. This is not a figment of imagination or something taken from a film. It is a fact, acknowledged by their own books and by historical evidence." In a subsequent interview with CNN's Wolf Blitzer, Hamdan defended his comments, stating that he was responding to comments made by Moshe Feiglin in the Israeli Knesset in which he called for the "complete destruction of the Palestinians in Gaza". Hamdan asserted that the organisation MEMRI had edited and 'cut' his words in a selective manor taking them out of context, going on to remark that "we are not against Jews, we are against the Israeli occupation".

References

Further reading

External links

Column archive at The Guardian

1965 births
Living people
Hamas members
Palestinian diplomats
Yarmouk University alumni
Palestinian politicians
Palestinian Muslims
Blood libel